Belopus is a genus of darkling beetles in the subfamily Lagriinae.

Species
 Belopus crassipes (Fischer de Waldheim, 1844)
 Belopus csikii Reitter, 1920
 Belopus elongatus (Herbst, 1797)
 Belopus heydeni (Zoufal, 1893)
 Belopus proceroides Leo, 1984
 Belopus procerus (Mulsant, 1854)
 Belopus raffrayi (Fairmaire, 1873)
 Belopus reitteri (Zoufal, 1893)
 Belopus sulcatus (Fischer de Waldheim, 1844)
 Belopus tibialis (Zoufal, 1893)

References

External links

Lagriinae
Tenebrionidae genera